is a train station in Nakataru 1-chōme, Arita, Saga Prefecture, Japan. It is operated by JR Kyushu and is on the Sasebo Line.

Lines
Only Sasebo Line local services stop at this station.

Station layout 
The station, which is unstaffed, consists of two staggered side platforms serving two tracks with a siding branching off track 2 and running on the other side of platform 2. The station building is an original Meiji-era timber structure built in 1909 when the station opened for passenger traffic. Access to the opposite side platform is by means of a footbridge.

The station is normally unstaffed but some types of tickets are available from a kan'i itaku agent outside the station. In addition, during the "Arita Pottery City", a major ceramic pottery fair held in the town of Arita during Golden Week, a ticket window with a POS machine would be set up.

Adjacent stations

History
On 1 October 1989. the station was opened as an intermediate station on the existing track between Takeo-Onsen and Haiki. At the time it was named  and was for freight only. When the Kyushu Railway was nationalized on 1 July 1907, Japanese Government Railways (JGR) took over control of the station. On 1 May 1909, passenger services commenced and the station was renamed Kami-Arita. On 12 October 1909, track from Tosu through Kami-Arita and Haiki to Nagasaki was designated the Nagasaki Main Line. As such, Kami-Arita became part of the Sasebo Line. With the privatization of Japanese National Railways (JNR), the successor of JGR, on 1 April 1987, control of the station passed to JR Kyushu.

Passenger statistics
In fiscal 2015, there were a total of 39,518 boarding passengers, giving a daily average of 108 passengers.

Environs
National Route 35
Arita art museum of ceramics porcelain

See also
 List of railway stations in Japan

References

External links
Kami-Arita Station (JR Kyushu)

Railway stations in Japan opened in 1898
Sasebo Line
Railway stations in Saga Prefecture